The International Quilt Museum at the University of Nebraska–Lincoln in Lincoln, Nebraska is the home of the largest known public collection of quilts in the world. Also known as Quilt House, the current facility opened in 2008.

History 
The International Quilt Museum was founded in 1997 when native Nebraskans Ardis and Robert James donated their collection of nearly 950 quilts to the University of Nebraska-Lincoln. Their contribution became the centerpiece of what is now the largest publicly held quilt collection in the world.

Through private funds from the University of Nebraska Foundation and a lead gift from the James family, the center opened in its new location in 2008. The glass and brick “green” building, designed by Robert A.M. Stern Architects, houses the quilts, a state-of-the-art research and storage space, educational displays, and custom-crafted galleries where selections from the collections and special exhibitions are shown to the public on a rotating basis. In 2015, the museum opened a privately funded expansion that doubled its collections storage and gallery space. In July 2019, the museum changed its name to the International Quilt Museum or IQM.

The quilts range from early examples of American and European quilts to contemporary studio quilts and international quilts. The collection now numbers more than 6000 quilts from fifty countries, dating from the 17th century to the present. Faculty and curatorial staff, visiting scholars and graduate student researchers pursue the study of the world's quilt heritage at the center, and an ongoing acquisitions program seeks to document the full scope of global quilting traditions. The museum publishes catalogues to accompany some of its exhibitions, and these have included Wild by Design, Quilts in Common, American Quilts in the Modern Age 1870 - 1940, Perspectives: Art, Craft, Design and the Studio Quilt, and Marseille: The Cradle of White Corded Quilting.

The museum is located at 1523 N. 33rd Street in Lincoln, NE.

The University of Nebraska-Lincoln's Department of Textiles, Merchandising and Fashion Design in the College of Education and Human Sciences offers a master's degree in Textile History with a quilt studies emphasis.

Gallery

References

External links
 International Quilt Museum
 Master of Arts Degree in Textile History with a Quilt Studies Emphasis at University of Nebraska-Lincoln

Quilt museums in the United States
Folk art museums and galleries in Nebraska
University of Nebraska–Lincoln
Museums in Lincoln, Nebraska
Buildings and structures in Lincoln, Nebraska
University museums in Nebraska
Art museums and galleries in Nebraska
Art museums established in 1997
1997 establishments in Nebraska
Robert A. M. Stern buildings